Joseph Knauer (1 December 1764 – 16 May 1844) was great dean of Kladsko from 1808 to 1843 and Catholic Bishop of Wrocław from 1843 to 1844.

Biography

Childhood and youth
He was born in Czerwony Strumień, Kingdom of Prussia, into a poor family of cottagers from Czerwony Strumień on 1 December 1764. His parents were Jan Knauer and Teresa Lux. After graduating from elementary school in Międzylesie he continued his education at a Catholic high school in Wroclaw. He earned his living as a chorister and through a private tutor, he could began his studies in philosophy and theology at the University of Wrocław.

Pastoral work in the county of Kladsko
On 7 March 1789 Knauer was ordained priest, after which he was sent to Międzylesie, where he served as a chaplain. In 1794 he was appointed parish priest of the Marian Shrine in Wambierzyce and in 1814 he was appointed parish priest in Bystrzyca Kłodzka.

Grand Dean of Kladsko
In 1808 while still a priest he was nominated by the King of Prussia Frederick William III of Prussia grand dean of the earldom, a position he filled on 16 January 1809 when Archbishop of Prague, Wilhelm Florentin Fürst von Salm appointed him archbishop's vicar of the County of Kladsko. In 1810, the name for the Dean of Klatsko was renamed to Großdechant. Since this was merely a title of honor to which no authority was given, Knauer doubted its purpose. During his bishopric, Pope Pius VII, issued the bull De salute animarum on 16 July 1821 which confirmed the membership of the Kłodzko to the archbishopric of Prague, but also introduced a stronger link between the Deanery of the Diocese of Wroclaw. and each dean was to become an honorary canon of Wrocław. Knauer was then chosen as priest from Kladsko land.

In 1837 the faculty of theology of the University of Wroclaw awarded him with an honorary doctorate. On 27 August 1841 Knauer became a member of the Wroclaw Cathedral's chapter.

Roman Catholic Bishop of Breslau and death
On 6 February 1843 Pope Gregory XVI appointed him bishop of Wroclaw. His enthronement took place on 23 April 1843 and his episcopal ordination was performed by Auxiliary Bishop Daniel Latussek.

Knauer was already very old. During his brief reign he was in conflict with a German national church founded by Fr. Johannes Ronge. He died on 16 May 1844 in Wroclaw, and was buried in the basement of Cathedral of St. John the Baptist in Wrocław.

Bibliography
Pater, Józef, Poczet biskupów wrocławskich , Wrocław 2000, DTSK Silesia, 2000, p. 143, https://books.google.cz/books/about/Poczet_biskupów_wrocławskich.html?id=IEAmAQAAIAAJ&redir_esc=y&hl=pt-BR.
Herzig A., M. Ruchniewicz, History of the Kłodzko Region, Hamburg-Wroclaw 2006.
 Franz Heinrich Reusch: Knauer, Joseph. In: General German Biography (ADB). Volume 16, Duncker & Humblot, Leipzig 1882, p. 269 f, https://de.m.wikisource.org/wiki/ADB:Knauer,_Joseph.
 The County of Glatz. Volume V. Lüdenscheid 1968.
 Staff schematics of the Catholic clergy from the county of Glatz. 1994.
 Michael Hirschfeld: Joseph Knauer, Grand Dean of the County of Glatz and Prince-Bishop of Wroclaw. In: AGG-Mitteilungen, Vol. 15 (2016), pp. 1–10.

References

External links
http://www.catholic-hierarchy.org/bishop/bknauer.html
http://www.gcatholic.org/dioceses/diocese/wroc0.htm
 http://www.grafschaft-glatz.de/kultur/kultur17.htm

1764 births
1844 deaths
People from Kłodzko County
People from Prussian Silesia
Bishops of Wrocław
19th-century German Roman Catholic bishops